Kaczor is a Polish-language surname meaning "drake" (male duck). It may appear as Kačor, Kachor, Katschor, or Katchor in other languages. It is a cognate of the Ukrainian surname Kachur. In Poland, Kaczor is particularly common in south-eastern and central-eastern areas.

People
 Joanna Kaczor (born 1984), Polish volleyball player
 Josef Kaczor (born 1953), German footballer
 Kazimierz Kaczor (born 1941), Polish actor and television presenter
 Kazimierz Kaczor (footballer) (1895–1972), Polish footballer
 Laura Kaczor (born 1982), American musician
 Nate Kaczor (born 1967), American football coordinator
 Rafał Kaczor (born 1982), Polish amateur boxer
 Richie Kaczor (1952–1993), American musician
 Stanisław Kaczor-Batowski (1866–1946), Polish painter
 Ben Katchor (born 1951), American cartoonist

References

See also
 

Polish-language surnames